Declaration of Independence is the fourth studio album by American country rap artist Colt Ford.  It was released on August 7, 2012 through Average Joe's Entertainment Group. The album includes the singles "Answer to No One," "Back" and "Drivin' Around Song."

Reviews
An uncredited review from the Associated Press was favorable, saying that "Ford not only illustrates that country music can continue to draw on other contemporary musical styles, he also shows that modern-era rednecks can mix with the rest of the world, too." Bobby Peacock of Roughstock rated it four stars out of five, similarly saying that it "finds him once again bridging the gap between two diametrically opposite genres with skill." Giving it three-and-a-half stars out of five, Stephen Thomas Erlewine of Allmusic compared the sound to Kid Rock, saying that Ford had "swagger" and "bravado". Sam Gazdziak of Country Standard Time gave a mixed review, praising "All In" and "Way Too Early" as the countriest-sounding, and calling "Angels & Demuns" a standout, but criticizing some of the songs' themes by saying that "The 'country pride' songs dominate, and there are so many of them saying essentially the same thing that they become indistinguishable." As of Oct. 28,2012 the album has sold 106,000 copies.

Track listing

Production

Producer: Dann Huff: Tracks 2, 5, 8 and 11

Producer: Mike Hartnett and Corey Smith: Track 10

Producer: Phive Starr: Tracks 7 and 12

Producer: Shannon Houchins: Tracks 1, 3, 4, 6, 9, 13, 14 and 15

Mixing: Billy Decker: Tracks 1, 3, 4, 6, 9, 12, 13, 14 and 15

Mixing: Justin Niebank: Tracks 2, 5, 8 and 11

Mixing: Phive Starr: Track 7

Mixing: Billy Hume: Track 10

Mastering - Noah Gordon

Charts

Weekly charts

Year-end charts

Singles

References

2012 albums
Colt Ford albums
Average Joes Entertainment albums